Prior is an unincorporated community in Douglas County, Missouri, United States. The community is located on Missouri Route 95, just north of the intersection with Missouri Route 76 and 2.5 miles north of Vanzant.

History
A post office called Prior was established in 1894, and remained in operation until 1939. The community was named after an early settler.

References

Unincorporated communities in Douglas County, Missouri
1894 establishments in Missouri
Unincorporated communities in Missouri